Mammoth Mountain is a lava dome complex partially located within the town of Mammoth Lakes, California, in the Inyo National Forest of Madera and Mono Counties. It is home to a large ski area primarily on the Mono County side.

Mammoth Mountain was formed in a series of eruptions that ended 57,000 years ago. Mammoth still produces hazardous volcanic gases that kill trees and caused ski patroller fatalities in 2006.

Geology
Mammoth Mountain is a lava dome complex in Mono County, California. It lies in the southwestern corner of the Long Valley Caldera and consists of about 12 rhyodacite and dacite overlapping domes. These domes formed in a long series of eruptions from 110,000 to 57,000 years ago, building a volcano that reaches  in elevation. During this time, massive dacite eruptions occurred roughly every 5000 years. The volcano is still active with minor eruptions, the largest of which was a minor phreatic (steam) eruption 700 years ago.

Mammoth Mountain also lies on the south end of the Mono-Inyo chain of volcanic craters. The magma source for Mammoth Mountain is distinct from those of both the Long Valley Caldera and the Inyo Craters.
Mammoth Mountain is composed primarily of dacite and rhyolite, part of which has been altered by hydrothermal activity from fumaroles (steam vents).

Volcanic gas discharge
Mammoth is outgassing large amounts of carbon dioxide out of its south flank, near Horseshoe Lake, causing mazuku in that area. The concentration of carbon dioxide in the ground ranges from 20 to 90 percent .

The tree-kills originally were attributed to a severe drought that affected California in the late 1980s and early 1990s. Another idea was that the kills were the result of a pathogen or other biological infestation. However, neither idea explained why all trees in the affected areas were killed regardless of age or health. Then, in March 1990, a U.S. Forest Service Ranger became ill with suffocation symptoms after being in a snow-covered cabin near Horseshoe Lake.

As of 2003, the concentration of carbon dioxide in soil gas at Mammoth Mountain is being monitored on a continuous, year-round basis at four sites—three at Horseshoe Lake and one near the base of Chair 19 at the ski area.

Measurements of helium emissions support the theory that the gases emitted in the tree kill area have the same source as those discharged from Mammoth Mountain Fumarole. There is evidence that the rate of  discharge has been declining, with emissions peaking in 1991.

Ski patrol fatalities incident
In April 2006, three members of the Mammoth Mountain Ski Area ski patrol died while on duty. All three died from suffocation by carbon dioxide when they fell into a fumarole on the slopes of the mountain. As the ski patrollers assessed the fumarole for skier safety, the perimeter snow collapsed dropping the one patroller  into the bottom of the fumarole where the  levels are life-threatening within minutes. A second patroller dropped into the fumarole in an effort to rescue the first and then the third patroller followed into rescue where all succumbed fatally to the toxic gas. Ultimately, a team of responders had to enter the fumarole with gas masks to retrieve the bodies.

Recreational use

Mammoth Mountain is home to the Mammoth Mountain Ski Area, founded by Dave McCoy in 1953. Mammoth is a ski, snowboard, and snowmobile mountain during the winter months. Mammoth is the highest ski resort in California and is notable for the unusually large amount of snowfall it receives compared to other Eastern Sierra peaks—about 400" (1,000 cm) annually and about 300 out of 365 days of sunshine—due to its location in a low gap in the Sierra crest. In the summer months the ski gondolas are used by mountain bikers and  tourists who wish to get a summit view of Long Valley Caldera directly to the east and Sierra peaks to the west, south and north. To the south of the mountain, there are a number of lakes that serve as tourist attractions in the summer.

References

Further reading

External links

 Mammoth Mountain Ski Area trail map
 USGS Volcano Hazards Program, Long Valley Observatory
 QTVR of tree kill area
 Mammoth Earthquake 1980 May 25 16:33, 16:49, 19:44 UTC  Magnitude 6.2, 5.9, 5.9

Inyo National Forest
Pleistocene lava domes
Mountains of Madera County, California
Mountains of Mono County, California
Mountains of the Sierra Nevada (United States)
Volcanoes of Madera County, California
Volcanoes of Mono County, California
Mountains of Northern California
Volcanism of California
Volcanoes of California
Holocene lava domes